Burj al-Qasab is a town in northwestern Syria, administratively part of the Latakia Governorate, located north of Latakia close to Ras Ibn Hani. Nearby localities include Al-Shamiyah and Burj Islam to the north, Kirsana to the northeast, Sitmarkho and al-Qanjarah to the east. According to the Syria Central Bureau of Statistics, Burj al-Qasab had a population of 4,902 in the 2004 census. Its inhabitants are predominantly Alawites.  The ancient site of Ugarit sits on the tell east of the village.

References

Populated places in Latakia District
Populated coastal places in Syria
Alawite communities in Syria